The 1956 winners of the Torneo di Viareggio (in English, the Viareggio Tournament, officially the Viareggio Cup World Football Tournament Coppa Carnevale), the annual youth football tournament held in Viareggio, Tuscany, are listed below.

Format
The 16 teams are organized in knockout rounds, all played single tie.

Participating teams
Italian teams

  Atalanta
  Bologna
  Fiorentina
  Genoa
  Lanerossi Vicenza
  Lazio
  Milan
  Modena
  Padova
  Sampdoria
  S.P.A.L.
  Udinese

European teams

  Bayern München
  Deportivo Madrid
  Spartak Praha
  Odense

Tournament fixtures

Champions

Footnotes

External links
 Official Site (Italian)
 Results on RSSSF.com

1956
1955–56 in Italian football
1955–56 in Spanish football
1955–56 in Danish football
1955–56 in German football
1955–56 in Czechoslovak football